Naval Medical Research Unit One was a research laboratory of the US Navy which was founded as Naval Laboratory Research Unit 1, a Naval Reserve Unit at the University of California Berkeley in the life sciences building in 1934 after a campaign by a Berkeley scientist Albert P. Krueger to the Bureau of Medicine and Surgery to have a laboratory to study and prevent influenza and respiratory infections in naval forces. It was mobilized as an active duty naval unit in 1941 to study the epidemiological impact of diseases such as influenza, meningitis, and catarrhal fever,  as well as tropical diseases such as malaria on the US Navy during World War II.

In 1943, Naval Laboratory Research Unit-1 was renamed Naval Medical Research Unit No. 1 (NAMRU-1) to reflect is broader mission of field-based and not just lab-based research. In 1950 the lab was moved to the Naval Supply Center, Oakland. Following the start of the Korean War, the Navy became concerned about attacks on its forces by biological weapons and from 1952 to '55, the Navy asked Krueger to resign his position on the faculty of Berkeley and devote all his research to prevention of respiratory infections. Hence the Navy poured more resources into NAMRU-1 facilities, developing them into a preeminent world laboratory on respiratory routes of infection.

NAMRU-1 was disestablished in 1974.

Commanding officers
Albert P Krueger 1941-6

References 
R&D Chronicles: Dr. Krueger and the Story of the First NAMRU
Navy Research timeline
In Memoriam: Albert P Krueger
Elberg SS Graduate education and microbiology at the University of California, Berkeley, 1930-1989

External links 
 Navy Medical Research timeline

Military medical research of the United States Navy
Military units and formations disestablished in 1974
Military in California
Medical and health organizations based in California